The Division 1 Féminine is the highest league of women's football in France. The league, which started in 1974, was divided in two separate divisions (Division 2 Féminine and Division 3 Féminine). The following players must meet both of the following two criteria:
Have played at least one Division 1 Féminine game. Players who were signed by Division 1 Féminine clubs, but only played in lower leagues, cup games and/or European games, or did not play in any competitive games at all, are not included.

Clubs listed are those for which the player has played at least one Division 1 Féminine game.

In bold: players who are currently under contract by a Division 1 Féminine club.

Africa (CAF)

Algeria 
Morgane Belkhiter
Sofia Guellati

Cameroon 
Michaela Abam
Claudine Meffometou
Charlène Meyong
Marlyse Ngo Ndoumbouk
Jeannette Yango

Ivory Coast 
Mariam Diakité
Inès Konan
Rosemonde Kouassi

Mali 
Aissata Traoré

Morocco 
Salma Amani

Nigeria 
Chiamaka Nnadozie
Evelyn Nwabuoku
Desire Oparanozie
Cynthia Uwak

South Africa 
Ode Fulutudilu

Tunisia 
Leïla Maknoun

Asia (AFC)

Australia 
 Ellie Carpenter
 Lydia Williams

China 
 Wang Fei
 Li Mengwen

Japan 
 Saki Kumagai
 Shinobu Ohno
 Ami Otaki

Europe (UEFA)

Austria 
Marina Georgieva

Belgium 
Lisa Lichtfus

Bulgaria 
Dessi Dupuy

Czech Republic 
Barbora Votíková

Denmark 
 Dorte Dalum Jensen
 Line Røddik Hansen
 Cecilie Sandvej

England 
Tinaya Alexander
Lucy Bronze – Lyon – 2017–2020
Izzy Christiansen – Lyon – 2018–2019
Jenna Dear
Alex Greenwood – Lyon – 2019–2020
Anna Moorhouse
Nikita Parris – Lyon  – 2019–2021
Jodie Taylor – Lyon – 2020–2021

Finland 
Katriina Talaslahti

Germany 
 Pauline Bremer
 Sara Däbritz
 Josephine Henning
 Dzsenifer Marozsán
 Carolin Simon

Greece 
Sophia Koggouli

Iceland 
Sara Björk Gunnarsdóttir
Berglind Björg Þorvaldsdóttir

Ireland 
Kyra Carusa
Niamh Fahey
Chloe Mustaki
Anne O'Brien
Fiona O'Sullivan
Stephanie Roche

Italy 
Sara Gama
Rose Reilly

Malta 
Shona Zammit

Montenegro 
Jelena Karličić

Netherlands 
 Damaris Egurrola
 Anouk Dekker
 Daniëlle van de Donk
 Sisca Folkertsma
 Loes Geurts
 Jackie Groenen
 Sisca Folkertsma
 Loes Geurts
 Shanice van de Sanden

Norway 
Ada Hegerberg – Lyon – 2014-
 Isabell Herlovsen
 Christine Colombo Nilsen
 Bente Nordby
 Andrea Norheim
 Karina Sævik
 Ingvild Stensland

Poland 
Paulina Dudek
Dominika Grabowska
Małgorzata Grec
Ewelina Kamczyk
Mady Solow

Portugal 
Mélissa Gomes
Jéssica Silva

Russia 
Irina Grigorieva
Ekaterina Tyryshkina

Scotland 
 Jen Beattie
 Edna Neillis

Spain 
María Díaz Cirauqui

Sweden 
 Kosovare Asllani
 Emma Holmgren
 Amelie Rybäck
 Lotta Schelin
 Caroline Seger

Switzerland 
Eseosa Aigbogun
Ramona Bachmann
Lara Dickenmann
Sally Julini
Coumba Sow
Meriame Terchoun

Turkey 
 İpek Kaya

Ukraine 
 Tetyana Romanenko

Wales 
 Jess Fishlock

North, Central America and Caribbean (CONCACAF)

Canada 
 Vanessa Gilles
 Jenna Hellstrom
 Ashley Lawrence
 Marie Levasseur
 Amandine Pierre-Louis

Costa Rica 
Shirley Cruz
Melissa Herrera

Haiti 
Roselord Borgella
Melchie Dumornay
Batcheba Louis
Kethna Louis
Nérilia Mondésir

Jamaica 
 Khadija Shaw
 Rebecca Spencer
 Chantelle Swaby

Mexico 
 Cristina Ferral

United States 
 Malia Berkely
 Celeste Boureille
 Morgan Brian
 Alana Cook
 Rachel Corboz
 Hannah Diaz
 Lorrie Fair
 Sh'Nia Gordon
 Carlin Hudson
 Darian Jenkins
 Samantha Johnson
 Phallon Tullis-Joyce
 Tobin Heath – PSG – 2013–2014
Lindsey Horan – Lyon – 2022
 Catarina Macario
Alex Morgan – Lyon – 2017
 Megan Rapinoe
 Hope Solo
 Aly Wagner
 Christie Welsh
 Carleigh Williams

South America (CONMEBOL)

Argentina 
Sole Jaimes

Brazil 
 Kátia
 Rosana
 Simone
 Kathellen Sousa

Chile 
 Christiane Endler

Notes

References

 
France
Division 1 Féminine
 
Association football player non-biographical articles